Užubaliai is a village in Panevėžys County, in northern Lithuania. According to the 2021 census, the village had a population of 50 inhabitants.

History
On 14 January 2023, a sinkhole formed in the village.

Demography

References

Villages in Panevėžys County
Biržai District Municipality